The Cosby Show is an American television sitcom co-created by and starring Bill Cosby. The series aired from September 20, 1984, to April 30, 1992, on NBC. It focuses on an upper middle-class African-American family living in Brooklyn, New York; the series was based on comedy routines in Cosby's stand-up comedy act, which in turn were based on his family life. The series was followed by a spin-off, titled A Different World, broadcast from 1987 to 1993 for 144 episodes in six seasons.

TV Guide listed the series as "TV's biggest hit in the 1980s", adding it "almost single-handedly revived the sitcom genre and NBC's ratings fortunes", while also ranking it 28th on their list of 50 Greatest Shows; with this list, Cliff Huxtable was named as the "Greatest Television Dad" in 2014. In May 1992, Entertainment Weekly stated that The Cosby Show helped to make possible a larger variety of shows with a predominantly black cast, from In Living Color to The Fresh Prince of Bel-Air.

The Cosby Show spent five consecutive seasons as the number-one rated show on television and, along with All in the Family, is the only sitcom in the history of the Nielsen ratings as the number-one show for five seasons, having spent the series in the top 20 ratings. 201 episodes were produced.

Premise
The show focuses on the Huxtable family, an African-American  upper middle   class family, living in a brownstone in Brooklyn Heights, New York, at 10 Stigwood Avenue. The father is Cliff Huxtable, an obstetrician and son of a prominent jazz trombonist. The mother is his wife, lawyer Clair Huxtable.

They have four daughters and one son: Sondra, Denise, Theo, Vanessa, and Rudy. Despite its comedic tone, the show sometimes involves serious subjects, like Theo's experiences dealing with dyslexia, inspired by Cosby's dyslexic son, Ennis. The show also deals with teenage pregnancy when Denise's friend Veronica (Lela Rochon) becomes pregnant.

Episodes

Pilot

The Cosby Show pilot episode uses the same title sequence as the rest of the first season, and is widely regarded as the first episode. However, it contains a number of differences from the remainder of the series.

In the pilot, the Huxtables have only four children. Following the pilot, the Huxtables have five children, with the addition of their eldest daughter, Sondra (Sabrina Le Beauf), who is mentioned in episode four and appears first in episode 11. The character was created when Bill Cosby wanted the show to express the accomplishment of successfully raising a child who had graduated from college.

Bill Cosby originally wanted Vanessa Williams to play the part of Sondra due to her college education and background in theater arts. However, Williams had recently been crowned the first black Miss America and pageant officials would not permit her to play the role while she was representing the Miss America pageant. Whitney Houston was also considered for the role of Denise Huxtable, but was unable to commit to the full-time television production schedule in the NBC contract, as she intended to become a full-time music recording artist.

Most of the story in the pilot presentation is taken from Bill Cosby's 1983 comedy film Bill Cosby: Himself. Cosby's character is called "Clifford" in the early episodes of the first season, but his name was later switched to "Heathcliff".

Additionally, Vanessa refers to Theo as "Teddy" twice in the dining room scene. The interior of the Huxtables' home features an entirely different living room from subsequent episodes, and different color schemes in the dining room and the master bedroom. Throughout the remainder of the series, the dining room is reserved for more formal occasions.

Background and production

Conception and development

In the early 1980s, Marcy Carsey and Tom Werner, two former executives at ABC, left the network to start their own production company: Carsey-Werner. At ABC, they had overseen sitcoms such as Mork & Mindy, Three's Company, and Welcome Back, Kotter. The two partners decided that to get a sitcom to sell for their fledgling company, they needed a big name behind it. The career of Bill Cosby, who starred in two failed sitcoms during the 1970s, produced award-winning stand-up comedy albums, and had roles in several different films, was relatively static during the early 1980s. According to a Chicago Tribune article from July 1985, despite Carsey and Werner's connection to the network, Lewis Erlicht, president of ABC Entertainment, passed on the show, prompting a pitch to rival network, NBC.

Outside of his work on his cartoon series Fat Albert and the Cosby Kids, Cosby was doing little in film or television, but Carsey and Werner were fans of Cosby's stand-up comedy and thought it would be the perfect material for a family sitcom.

Cosby originally proposed that the couple should both have blue-collar worker jobs, with the father a limousine driver, who owned his own car, and the mother an electrician. With advice from his wife Camille Cosby, though, the concept was changed so that the family was well-off financially, with the mother a lawyer and the father a physician.

Cosby wanted the program to be educational, reflecting his own background in education. He also insisted that the program be taped in New York City instead of Los Angeles, where most television programs were taped. The Huxtable home exterior was filmed at 10 St. Luke's Place near 7th Avenue in Manhattan's Greenwich Village (although in the show, the residence was the fictional "10 Stigwood Avenue").

Production notes

Early episodes were videotaped at NBC's Brooklyn studios (subsequently JC Studios). The network later sold that building, and production moved to the Kaufman Astoria Studios in Queens. Even though the show was set to take place in Brooklyn, the exterior façade was actually of a brownstone townhouse located in Manhattan's Greenwich Village at 10 Leroy Street/ 10 St. Luke's Place. The pilot was filmed in May 1984, with season one's production commencing that July, and the first taping on August 1 (Goodbye Mr. Goldfish).

During its original NBC run, it was one of five successful sitcoms on the network that featured predominantly African-American casts. The others were 227 (1985–90), Amen (1986–91), Cosby Show spin-off A Different World (1987–93) and The Fresh Prince of Bel-Air (1990–96).

Although the cast and characters were predominantly African-American, the program was unusual in that issues of race were rarely mentioned when compared to other situation comedies of the time with predominantly African-American casts, such as The Jeffersons. However, The Cosby Show had African-American themes, such as the Civil rights movement, and it frequently promoted African-American culture and culture of Africa represented by artists and musicians such as Jacob Lawrence, Miles Davis, James Brown, B.B. King, Stevie Wonder, Sammy Davis Jr., Lena Horne, Duke Ellington, Dizzy Gillespie and Miriam Makeba.

The spin-off, A Different World, dealt with racial issues more often. The series finale (taped March 6, 1992) aired during the 1992 Los Angeles riots, with Cosby quoted in media at the time pleading for peace.

During the third season, Rashad was pregnant with her daughter Condola. Rather than write this pregnancy in, the producers simply greatly reduced Rashad's scenes or filmed in such a way that her pregnancy was not noticeable.

Another main cast member pregnancy, that of Bonet, almost caused the actress to be fired, especially coming in the wake of appearing in the film Angel Heart, which contained explicit sexual scenes with actor Mickey Rourke. Cosby strongly disapproved of Bonet's role, but allowed her to continue on World until returning to Cosby after her pregnancy. Tensions remained, however, and Bonet was eventually fired in April 1991.

Theme song and opening sequence
The show's theme music, "Kiss Me", was composed by Stu Gardner and Bill Cosby. Seven versions of this theme were used during the run of the series, making it one of the few television series to use multiple versions of the same theme song over the course of a series. For season four, the theme song music was performed by musician Bobby McFerrin.

Due to legal complications regarding the background mural, the opening for season seven was filmed on August 17, 1990, at Kaufman Astoria Studios in New York City, New York was replaced with the one from the previous season. The original season seven opening, with slight modifications, returned to use in the beginning of season eight.

Cast and characters

Reception and legacy
The show's portrayal of a successful, stable black family was praised by some for breaking racial stereotypes and showing another part of the African-American experience. However, it was criticized by others, including Henry Louis Gates Jr., for allowing white audiences to think that racism and poverty were problems of the past. As a result of the Bill Cosby sexual assault cases, Malcolm-Jamal Warner has stated that the show's legacy is "tarnished".

Broadcast history and ratings
The Cosby Show aired on Thursdays at 8:00 pm for all eight seasons. In its first season, the show was the beginning of a Thursday NBC schedule that was followed by Family Ties, Cheers, Night Court, and Hill Street Blues.

The Cosby Show is one of three television programs (All in the Family and American Idol being the others) that were number one in the Nielsen ratings for five consecutive seasons.

Syndication
The Carsey-Werner Company handles domestic distribution, while Paramount Global's unit CBS Media Ventures handles international distribution of the series, and has done so since 1997. In the United States, The Cosby Show began its television syndication run in September 1988 in broadcast syndication, shortly before the show's fifth-season premiere, and was at the time distributed by Viacom; many stations that carried the series were Big Three television networks affiliates. As time went on, this moved to lower-profile timeslots, independent station and minor network affiliates.

Fort Worth, Texas–based independent station KTVT carried the series until 1995, when it ceased operating as a regional cable superstation and became an affiliate of CBS. TBS, then a national cable superstation, carried the series for nearly a decade beginning in 1999. Fellow superstation WGN America began carrying the series shortly thereafter, and continued to until September 2010. Viacom's Nick at Nite began airing reruns of the series in March 2002, and its sister network TV Land began airing reruns in 2004, making The Cosby Show one of the few series that were shown on both Nick at Nite and TV Land at the same time. The series was also available to stream on Hulu.

The French version just called Cosby Show aired on M6 in 1988.

In the Italian version of the show, the family name is not Huxtable but Robinson. The whole show is named I Robinson (The Robinsons) airing on Canale 5 & K2 from 1986 until 1993.

2010s removal from syndication 
Reruns of The Cosby Show have been pulled from several networks and venues as a result of the Bill Cosby sexual assault cases. In November 2014, TV Land pulled the series from its lineup. "(E)pisodes have been pulled immediately for the foreseeable future ... TV Land even removed references to The Cosby Show from its website on Wednesday afternoon as the scandal accelerated." In December 2014, the Magic Johnson–owned network Aspire removed the show from its lineup.

BET's Centric (another Viacom unit), along with Bounce TV, ceased airing reruns of The Cosby Show. At the same time, barter syndicator The Program Exchange ceased distributing the show. Bounce TV resumed airing the series in December 2016 but pulled the show on April 26, 2018 — the day Cosby was convicted of sexual assault. TV One began airing reruns of the show in May 2017. It is currently the only American network to offer the series. The series is also available on FilmRise, Amazon Prime Video, and Sling TV.

Spin-off

The Cosby Shows producers created a spin-off series called A Different World that was built around the "Denise" character (portrayed by actress Lisa Bonet), the second of the Huxtables' four daughters. Initially, the new program dealt with Denise's life at Hillman College, the fictional historically black college from which her father, mother, and paternal grandfather had graduated.

Denise was written out of A Different World after its inaugural season, due to Bonet's pregnancy, and the following season was revamped, with the addition of director Debbie Allen (Phylicia Rashad's sister) and new characters. Denise later became a recurring character on The Cosby Show for seasons four and five, and a regular again in seasons six and seven.

Awards and honors

Awards won
Emmy Award
 Outstanding Comedy Series (1985)
 Outstanding Writing in a Comedy Series (1985) – Michael J. Leeson and Ed. Weinberger for the pilot episode
 Outstanding Directing in a Comedy Series (1985) – Jay Sandrich for "The Younger Woman"
 Outstanding Directing in a Comedy Series (1986) – Jay Sandrich for "Denise's Friend"
 Outstanding Guest Performer in a Comedy Series (1986) – Roscoe Lee Browne for "The Card Game" 
 Outstanding Editing for a Series – Multi-Camera Production (1986) – Henry Chan for "Full House"

Golden Globe Awards
 Best TV Series – Comedy (1985)
 Best Performance by an Actor in a TV Series – Comedy – Bill Cosby (1985, 1986) 2 wins

NAACP Image Awards
 Outstanding Comedy Series (1988)
 Outstanding Actress in a Comedy Series – Phylicia Rashad (1988, 1989) 2 wins
 Outstanding Actor in a Comedy Series – Bill Cosby (1989, 1993) 2 wins

Peabody Award (1986)

People's Choice Awards
 Favorite New TV Comedy Program (1985)
 Favorite Male Performer in a New TV Program – Bill Cosby (1985)
 Favorite Female Performer in a New TV Program – Phylicia Rashad (1985)
 Favorite TV Comedy Program (1985–89) 5 wins
 Favorite Male TV Performer – Bill Cosby (1986–92) 7 wins
 Favorite All-Around Male Entertainer – Bill Cosby (1986–88, 1990–91) 5 wins
 Favorite Young TV Performer – Keshia Knight Pulliam (1988)
 All-Time Favorite TV Program (1989)
 Favorite Female TV Performer – Phylicia Rashad (1989)
 Favorite All-Around Male Star – Bill Cosby (1989)
 Favorite TV Comedy Series (1990, 1992) 2 wins

Nominations
Emmy Awards
 Outstanding Technical Direction/Electronic Camerawork/video control for a series – 1985 
 Outstanding Live and Tape Sound Mixing and Sound Effects for a series – (1985) 2 nominations
 Outstanding Writing in a Comedy Series – (1985–86)
 Outstanding Lead Actress in a Comedy Series – Phylicia Rashad (1985–86) 2 nominations
 Outstanding Comedy Series (1986–87) 2 nominations
 Outstanding Supporting Actress in a Comedy Series – Lisa Bonet (1986)
 Outstanding Supporting Actress in a Comedy Series – Keshia Knight Pulliam (1986)
 Outstanding Supporting Actor in a Comedy Series – Malcolm-Jamal Warner (1986)
 Outstanding Sound Mixing for a Comedy Series or a Special – (1986–87)
 Outstanding Editing for a Series (multi camera production) – (1987)
 Outstanding Directing in a Comedy Series – Jay Sandrich (1987)
 Outstanding Comedy Series – (1987)
 Outstanding Guest Performer in a Comedy Series – Eileen Heckart (1988)
 Outstanding Guest Actor in a Comedy Series – Sammy Davis Jr. (1989)

Golden Globe Awards
 Best TV Series – Comedy – (1986–1987) – Two nominations
 Best Performance by an Actor in a TV Series – Comedy – Bill Cosby (1987)

Other honors
1993: TV Guide named The Cosby Show the All-Time Best Family Show in its issue celebrating 40 years of television.
 1997: TV Guide ranked the episode "Happy Anniversary" #54 on their list of the TV Guide's 100 Greatest Episodes of All Time
 1999: Entertainment Weekly placed show's debut at #24 in its list of the "100 Greatest Moments in Television"
 2002: TV Guide placed The Cosby Show at #28 in its list of the TV Guide's 50 Greatest TV Shows of All Time
 2004: TV Guide ranked Cliff Huxtable number 1 on its 50 Greatest TV Dads of All Time list
 2004: Bravo ranked Cliff Huxtable #44 on its list of the 100 Greatest TV Characters
 2007: Time magazine placed the show on its unranked list of "100 Best TV Shows of All-TIME"
 2007: USA Today'''s web site ranked the show as #8 in its list of the "top 25 TV moments of the past quarter century"
 2008: Entertainment Weekly selected Cliff Huxtable as the Dad for "The Perfect TV Family"<ref>"TV: Breaking Down the List," Entertainment Weekly," #999/1000 June 27 & July 4, 2008, 56.</ref>
 2013: TV Guide ranked The Cosby Show #26 on its list of the 60 Best Series.

Albums
Two albums were produced that included various theme and background music from the show. The albums were presented by longtime Cosby collaborator Stu Gardner. They were:

A House Full of Love: Music from The Cosby Show (1986)
Total Happiness (Music from the Bill Cosby Show, Vol. II) (1987)

In popular culture
 During the series' run, the character of Cliff Huxtable frequently wore an array of knit sweaters that were often brightly colored and featured abstract, asymmetrical patterns or themes. The sweaters were erroneously thought to be designed by the Australian clothing company Coogi, but were actually designed by Dutchman Koos Van Den Akker.

They were dubbed "Cosby sweaters", a term that is used to describe sweaters that are generally deemed garish and unappealing. In May 2008, Cosby's daughter Evin auctioned a batch of the sweaters that her father had kept on eBay. The proceeds of the sales went to the Hello Friend/Ennis William Cosby Foundation, a non-profit charity named for Ennis Cosby. Ennis, Cosby's only son, was murdered in January 1997.
 The character of Dr. Hibbert, who is featured on the long-running animated sitcom The Simpsons, is modeled after Dr. Cliff Huxtable. The Simpsons writing staff decided to make Dr. Hibbert a parody of Cliff Huxtable after the Fox network moved The Simpsons to Thursday nights airing opposite the top-rated The Cosby Show.
In the Teen Titans Go! episode "Oil Drums", Starfire says "I would like to watch The Crosby Pudding Half-Hour Show of Sweaters. Theo, get your glorp-nops off the kitchen table. Rudy!"

International broadcast
In The Philippines The Show aired on GMA Network, in 1985-1991 PTV-4 in 1992-1996 & ABC-5 in 1997-2001 (Tagalized). In the Unted Kingdom it was broadcast on Channel 4.

Home media
All eight seasons of The Cosby Show have been released on DVD in Region 1. Seasons one and two were released by UrbanWorks which was subsequently acquired by First Look Studios, who then released the remaining six seasons. Seasons One and Two contain special features, including the ninety minute retrospective documentary entitled The Cosby Show: A Look Back, which aired on NBC in May 2002.

It contains interviews with cast members, bloopers, deleted scenes and audition footage. In December 2010, First Look Studios filed bankruptcy, and all its assets were subsequently acquired by Millennium Entertainment, who also took over distribution of The Cosby Show DVD releases. As of 2013, these releases have been discontinued, and are now out of print.

On November 5, 2013, it was announced that Mill Creek Entertainment had acquired the rights to the series. They have subsequently re released all eight seasons on DVD. On September 1, 2015, Mill Creek released a sixteen disc complete series set entitled The Cosby Show – The Complete Series.

In Region 4, Magna Pacific has released all eight seasons on DVD in Australia and New Zealand. The first two seasons have similar artwork to the North American copies, although season two is red rather than blue. Each Australian cover also features the tagline "In a house full of love, there is always room for more".

Universal Studios Home Entertainment  has released Seasons 1 to 4 in Region 2 (United Kingdom).

Note: The Millennium Entertainment release of season one contains the edited versions of the episodes aired in syndication. However, all subsequent DVD releases (including the complete series set) contain the original, uncut broadcast versions. In 2011, Millennium quietly released season one uncut in Region 1, which featured the special features from The Complete Series set.

Notes

References

External links
 Official Bill Cosby Site
 The Cosby Show at CarseyWerner.net
 Carsey-Werner - The Cosby Show
 
 
 

 
1984 American television series debuts
1992 American television series endings
1980s American sitcoms
1990s American sitcoms
1980s American black sitcoms
1990s American black sitcoms
NBC original programming
English-language television shows
Brooklyn in fiction
Dyslexia in fiction
Nielsen ratings winners
Best Musical or Comedy Series Golden Globe winners
Peabody Award-winning television programs
Primetime Emmy Award for Outstanding Comedy Series winners
Television series about families
Television series by Carsey-Werner Productions
Television series created by Ed. Weinberger
Television series created by Bill Cosby
Television shows filmed in New York City
Television shows set in Brooklyn
Bill Cosby